Einar Thor, also known as Einar Þór Gunnlaugsson, (born August 2, 1964) is an Icelandic film director and writer primarily based in London since 1990. He has written and directed various films and videos, made dozens of radio programmes for Icelandic national radio and written articles on art, politics and culture. His filmmaking style has been described by critics as laid back, amusing and minimalistic.

Biography
Einar Thor grew up on a farm in northwest Iceland, and in his early years became also a part-time sailor in the nearby village, Flateyri, where he was also born.

He used to be a year ahead in junior school and left his home ground at the age of 14 for further studies in south Iceland, left school at the age of 17 to work in various jobs in fishing and farming, but continued his studies again at the age of 19.

At 23 he went as a volunteer to Nicaragua in 1988 during the Contras conflict. He returned to Europe where he graduated from the London Film School with a distinction in directing in 1992. He also studied mass media theory and Spanish at the University of Iceland and at the Universidad de Málaga, Spain, from 1988 to 1990, and later continued his academic studies at City University, London where he completed an MA in Art Management and Policy Making in the arts in 2001.

Career
Prior to films he took part in number of European conferences on cultural and social issues in Denmark, Germany, France and Spain as a member of the Executive Committee of the Icelandic Youth Council in 1989, and was actively involved in international exchange programs in Europe and Central America in 1988.

During his London years in the early 1990s he received a European council's grant to study in Spain, jury prize for his short film in Antalya, Turkey, nomination for the young film maker of the year award at the Edinburg film festival, and appeared in number of short films and videos as an actor, including the lead in a Soul II Soul music video for UN in 1994.

In late 1990s Einar was critical of the handing of film policy in Iceland, and in 2001 wrote his MA theses, "Film Policy in Iceland", a study on the state of the film community in Iceland at the time. Among his published articles in the late 1990s were pieces on the work of the Scandinavian writers Ibsen and Strindberg and interview with their English translator Michael Meyer, in addition to the short stories "Dolores" and "Time & Space".

After his latest dramatic work, Heiðin, aka Small Mountain was released (2008), Variety magazine called the film a 'kooky charm' and a critic at the National Radio 2 said he "continues to develop the art of filmmaking in the country", but Einar had previously made the satirical, stage-play-like movie The Third Name (2003), that went mostly unnoticed in his country. "Heiðin" was famously condemned for 'sacrificing a lamb for a movie' receiving 'zero stars' by some cinema goers, whereas in fact a lamb was convincingly fake-slaughtered in a key scene in the movie. In October 2010 his feature documentary North West was premiered in cinema in Iceland receiving favorable reviews and running for 6 weeks. In addition to North West / 2nd part, it was released on DVD late 2011. The documentary tells the story of a snow avalanche which hit the town he was born in.

Filmography 
 Regina (1992), short film.
 Rescue Dogs' (1997), documentary for National TV.
 Villiljós / Dramarama (2001), segment "Guð hrapar úr vélinni"
 Þriðja nafni / The Third Name (2003)
 Heiðin / Small Mountain (2008)
 Norð Vestur / North West (2010)
 Norð Vestur II / North West part 2'' (2011)

References

External links

Passport Pictures

1964 births
Living people
Alumni of City, University of London
Icelandic film directors